Lamin Jub, also rendered as Liman Jub, may refer to:
 Bala Lamin Jub
 Pain Lamin Jub